There is no single British Health Service.  However, England, Scotland, Wales and Northern Ireland each has a separate public healthcare system that is commonly referred to as the National Health Service or NHS.

National Health Service (England)
NHS Scotland
NHS Wales
Health and Social Care in Northern Ireland